Khalil Wheeler-Weaver (born April 20, 1996) is an American serial killer.

An Orange, New Jersey resident, Wheeler-Weaver lured his victims using dating apps and murdered three women and attempted to kill a fourth between August 2016 and November 2016. One of the victim's friends created a fake account and lured Wheeler-Weaver to a meeting before notifying police. After a jury found him guilty in 2019, he was convicted of three counts of murder and desecration of human remains, attempted murder, two counts of aggravated sexual assault, aggravated arson and kidnapping, and was sentenced to 160 years in prison. He will be eligible for parole in 140 years. Wheeler-Weaver maintained his innocence, claiming he was framed.

In March 2022, Wheeler-Weaver was charged with the October 2016 murder of 15-year-old Mawa Doumbia. Her remains were found in a house in Orange, New Jersey on May 9, 2019. Doumbia's remains were unidentified for more than two years.

Victims 
 Robin Daphne Michele West (19): strangled, set on fire
 Sarah Butler (20): strangled
 Joanne Browne (33): asphyxiated
 Mawa Doumbia (15): strangled, alleged

Tiffany Taylor, who woke up in the middle of an attack, was Wheeler-Weaver's sole surviving victim.

Early life 
Wheeler-Weaver was born on April 20, 1996 and grew up in the "well-to-do" neighborhood of Seven Oaks in Orange, New Jersey. He comes from a family of law enforcement officials employed in the region: his stepfather is a detective in the neighboring town of East Orange and his uncle is retired from the Newark Police Department.

As a member of the class of 2014 at Orange High School, he had few friends, did not participate in extra curricular activities, and did not date.

A high school classmate described Wheeler-Weaver's style as nerdy, and thought that his tucked-in shirts, khaki pants, and plain white shoes were evidence that he came from a "good home, a good family."

At the time of his crimes, Wheeler-Weaver worked as a security guard with Sterling Securities and, according to the search history on his phone, had hopes of becoming a police officer.

Crimes 
Wheeler-Weaver used a variety of usernames–including LilYachtRock, and pimpkillerghost–on the social networking site Tagged in order to arrange dates with victims. He specifically targeted sex workers and offered money in exchange for sex in his online conversations with victims. A member of the prosecution in his 2019 trial argued that he chose to target these women because, "[Wheeler-Weaver] made a wager that no one would miss them."

Little physical evidence ties Wheeler-Weaver to the murders he committed, as he wore gloves and condoms during encounters with victims. A small amount of his DNA was found beneath the fingernails of one victim. His phone's geolocation data, though, tracked his movements during and after the murders, both to the places where he arranged to meet victims and the locations where their bodies were later discovered. He also used his phone to search the phrase, "homemade poison to kill humans."

See also
 List of serial killers in the United States

References 

1996 births
2016 murders in the United States
21st-century American criminals
American male criminals
American people convicted of arson
American people convicted of attempted murder
American people convicted of kidnapping
American people convicted of murder
American people convicted of sexual assault
American rapists
American serial killers
Criminals from New Jersey
Living people
Male serial killers
Orange High School (New Jersey) alumni
People convicted of murder by New Jersey
People from Orange, New Jersey
Violence against women in the United States